A gonioreflectometer is a device for measuring a bidirectional reflectance distribution function (BRDF).

The device consists of a light source illuminating the material to be measured and a sensor that captures light reflected from that material. The light source should be able to illuminate and the sensor should be able to capture data from a hemisphere around the target. The hemispherical rotation dimensions of the sensor and light source are the four dimensions of the BRDF. The 'gonio' part of the word refers to the device's ability to measure at different angles.

Several similar devices have been built and used to capture data for similar functions. Most of these devices use a camera instead of the light intensity-measuring sensor to capture a two-dimensional sample of the target. Examples include:
a spatial gonioreflectometer for capturing the SBRDF (McAllister, 2002).
a camera gantry for capturing the light field (Levoy and Hanrahan, 1996).
an unnamed device for capturing the bidirectional texture function (Dana et al., 1999).

References 
Dana, Kristin et al. 1999. Reflectance and Texture of Real-World Surfaces. in ACM Transactions on Graphics. Volume 18, Issue 1 (January, 1999). New York, NY, USA: ACM Press. Pages 1-34. 
Foo, Sing Choong. 1997. A Gonioreflectometer for measuring the bidirectional reflectance of materials for use in illumination computations. Masters thesis. Cornell University. Ithaca, New York, USA.
Levoy, Marc & Hanrahan, Pat. 1996. Light field rendering. In Proceedings of the 23rd annual conference on Computer graphics and interactive techniques. 
McAllister, David. 2002. A Generalized Surface Appearance Representation for Computer Graphics. PhD dissertation. University of North Carolina at Chapel Hill, Department of Computer Science. Chapel Hill, USA. 118p.

Computer graphics
Photometry
Measuring instruments